Banjo Eyes is a musical based on the play Three Men on a Horse by John Cecil Holm and George Abbott. It has a book by Joseph Quinlan and Izzy Ellinson, music by Vernon Duke, and lyrics by John La Touche and Harold Adamson. 
 
Produced by Albert Lewis and staged by Hassard Short, the Broadway production opened on December 25, 1941 at the Hollywood Theatre, where it ran for 126 performances. The cast included Eddie Cantor, Lionel Stander, William Johnson, and, in a small role, future novelist Jacqueline Susann (Valley of the Dolls).

Although Cantor was known as "Banjo Eyes," the title referred not to his character but to a talking race horse, played in costume by the vaudeville team of Morton and Mayo. In dream sequences, Banjo Eyes would give Cantor's character tips on which horses were going to win different races, but warned him his supposed talent for picking the winners would vanish if he ever placed a bet himself. The book was a very loose adaptation of its source, and the World War II anthem "We Did It Before (And We Can Do It Again)" by Charles Tobias and Cliff Friend was interpolated into the score for no apparent reason other than to stir up patriotism among audience members. Cantor closed the show by singing a medley of his hits in his customary blackface. The show closed when its star suffered a medical emergency.

Song list

Act I
Birthday Card
Valentine’s Day Card
Easter Greetings
Merry Christmas
Mother’s Day
I’ll Take the City
The Toast of the Boys at the Post (music and lyrics by George Sumner)
I’ve Got to Hand It to You
A Nickel to My Name
Who Started the Rhumba?
It Could Only Happen in the Movies 

Act II
Make with the Feet 
We’re Having a Baby 
Banjo Eyes
The Yanks Are on the March Again
Not a Care in the World
We Did It Before (And We Can Do It Again)

References

External links

Musicals by Vernon Duke
1941 musicals
Broadway musicals
Musicals based on plays